Riverworld is a fictional universe in a series of science-fiction novels by Philip José Farmer.

Riverworld may also refer to:

 Riverworld (2003 film), a pilot episode for a Sci-Fi channel series that was never produced
 Riverworld (2010 film), a television film on the SyFy channel, a reboot of the 2003 film
 Riverworld (video game), a 1998 PC game adapted from the novel series